is a bus company in Kagawa Prefecture, Japan. The company operates only expressway route buses.

Bus Lines
The nickname of bus line in bold.

Expressway Buses runs midnight
For Tokyo
Shinjuku Line (Hello Bridge, Marugame, Takamatsu～Yokohama, Shinjuku, Hachioji); servicing it in collaboration with Nishi Tokyo Bus
For Nagoya
Nagoya Line (Sanuki Express Nagoya, Marugame, Takamatsu～Nagoya)
For Fukuoka
Fukuoka Line (Sanuki Express Fukuoka, Takamatsu, Marugame～Fukuoka); servicing it in collaboration with Nishitetsu Kosoku Bus (a group of Nishi-Nippon Railroad)

Past lines
 For Yokohama
 Yokohama Line (Sanuki Express Yokohama, Marugame, Takamatsu～Yokohama); servicing it in collaboration with Kotosan Bus - defunct on November 30, 2008

Expressway Buses runs in daytime
For Kansai region
Kyoto Line (Takamatsu Express Kyoto, Takamatsu～Kyoto); servicing it in collaboration with Keihan Bus (a company of Keihan Electric Railway group), JR Shikoku Bus and Nishinihon JR Bus  
Osaka Line (Sanuki Express Osaka, Takamatsu～Namba, Osaka); servicing it in collaboration with Hankyu Bus (a company of Hankyu Hanshin Holdings), JR Shikoku Bus and Nishinihon JR Bus
Osaka Line (Sanuki Express Osaka, Marugame, Zentsuji〜Kobe, Osaka, Namba, Universal Studios Japan)
Kansai Airport Line (Kansai Airport Limousine Bus, Takamatsu～Kansai Int'l Airport); servicing it in collaboration with JR Shikoku Bus, Nankai Bus (a company of Nankai Electric Railway group) and Kansai Airport Limousine.
Kobe Line (Sanuki Express Kobe, Takamatsu～Sannomiya, Shin-Kobe, Universal Studios Japan); servicing it in collaboration with Shinki Bus, JR Shikoku Bus and Nishinihon JR Bus  
Intercity in Shikoku island
Matsuyama Line (Bocchan Express, Takamatsu～Matsuyama); servicing it in collaboration with Iyo Railway (Bus division) and JR Shikoku Bus.
Kochi Line (Kuroshio Express, Takamatsu～Kochi); servicing it in collaboration with Tosa Electric Railway (Bus division) Kochiken Kotsu and JR Shikoku Bus
Tokushima Line (Kotoku Express, Takamatsu～Tokushima); servicing it in collaboration with Okawa Bus

Past lines
 For Yawatahama
 Yawatahama Line (Sanuki Express Yawatahama, Takamatsu～Uchiko, Ozu, Yawatahama); servicing it in collaboration with Iyotetsu Nan-yo Bus - defunct on March 31, 2010

References and external links
Shikoku Kōsoku Bus (Japanese)

Bus companies of Japan